The Ohtli Award or Reconocimiento Ohtli is an honor the Mexican Government gives to Mexican citizens who work in the United States and other countries and who have given assistance to Mexican citizens or promoted their culture.

About 
The Ohtli award is administered by the Secretariat of Foreign Affairs. It is given once annually by individual consulates and consists of a medallion, silver rosette and a diploma. The name of the award comes from the Nahuatl word which means "road" or "path." The medal depicts an Aztec god cutting grass with a machete. The symbolism of the name alludes to the idea of opening a path for others. The first award was given out in 1996. The award is one of the highest honors given to citizens living outside of Mexico. The Ohtli Award recognizes individuals who have aided, empowered or positively affected the lives of Mexican nationals in the United States and other countries.

Notable recipients 
Notable recipients are :

References 

Patricio Ibarguengoitia Franzoni 2020

External links 
 Official site (in Spanish)

Mexican awards
Orders, decorations, and medals of Mexico
Awards established in 1996